Pankovka is an urban locality (an urban-type settlement) in Novgorodsky District of Novgorod Oblast, Russia, located on the right bank of the Veryazha River, southwest of and immediately adjacent to Veliky Novgorod. Municipally, it is incorporated as Pankovskoye Urban Settlement in Novgorodsky Municipal District, one of the four urban settlements in the district. Population:

History

The village of Mostishchi was first mentioned in 1412. In this year, the Nikolayevsky Mostishchinsky Monastery was founded. In 1907, Mostishchi was mentioned as a part of Troitskaya Volost of Novgorodsky Uyezd of Novgorod Governorate. The origin of the settlement of Pankovka is unclear.

On August 1, 1927, the uyezds were abolished, and Novgorodsky District was established, with the center in the city of Novgorod. Both Pankovka and Mostishchi became a part of the district. The governorate was abolished as well, and the district belonged to Novgorod Okrug of Leningrad Oblast. On July 23, 1930 the okrugs were abolished, and the districts became directly subordinate to the oblast. Between August, 1941, and January, 1944 Pankovka was occupied by German troops. On July 5, 1944, Novgorodsky District was transferred to newly established Novgorod Oblast.

On March 28, 1977 the village of Mostishchi and the settlement of Pankovka were merged into the urban-type settlement of Pankovka.

Economy

Industry
In Pankovka, there are many enterprises, mainly in construction industry.

Transportation
Pankovka is located on a highway connecting Veliky Novgorod and Shimsk, which also offers connections to Pskov and Staraya Russa.

References

Notes

Sources

Urban-type settlements in Novgorod Oblast
Novgorodsky Uyezd
Novgorodsky District